The following is a list of ecoregions in the Seychelles, as identified by the Worldwide Fund for Nature (WWF).

Terrestrial ecoregions
by major habitat type

Tropical and subtropical moist broadleaf forests

 Granitic Seychelles forests

Deserts and xeric shrublands
 Aldabra Island xeric scrub

Freshwater ecoregions
by bioregion

Madagascar and the Indian Ocean Islands
 Coralline Seychelles
 Granitic Seychelles

Marine ecoregions
 Seychelles

References
 Burgess, Neil, Jennifer D’Amico Hales, Emma Underwood (2004). Terrestrial Ecoregions of Africa and Madagascar: A Conservation Assessment. Island Press, Washington DC.
 Spalding, Mark D., Helen E. Fox, Gerald R. Allen, Nick Davidson et al. "Marine Ecoregions of the World: A Bioregionalization of Coastal and Shelf Areas". Bioscience Vol. 57 No. 7, July/August 2007, pp. 573–583. 
 Thieme, Michelle L. (2005). Freshwater Ecoregions of Africa and Madagascar: A Conservation Assessment. Island Press, Washington DC.

 
Seychelles
Ecoregions